Douglas King may refer to:

Douglas King (politician) (1877–1930), British naval commander and politician
Doug King (1937–2011), American drag racer